The Auschwitz Report is a 2021 Slovak drama film directed by Peter Bebjak. It was selected as the Slovak entry for the Best International Feature Film at the 93rd Academy Awards, but it was not nominated.

Plot
The film is based on the true story of Rudolf Vrba and Alfréd Wetzler, two prisoners at the Auschwitz concentration camp who manage to escape with details about the camp's operation including a label from a canister of the pesticide Zyklon-B, used in the murders there. Once across the border into Žilina, Slovakia, they are asked by the resistance to type up their recollections, which later becomes known as the Vrba-Wetzler report. The pair are eventually introduced to a representative from the Red Cross, who despite disbelief at their claims agrees to pass on the report to the allies.

Cast
 Noel Czuczor as Freddy
 Peter Ondrejička as Valér
John Hannah as Warren
 Wojciech Mecwaldowski as Kozlowski
 Jacek Beler as Heršek
Jan Nedbal as Pavel
Christoph Bach as Schwarzhuber
Florian Panzner as Lausmann
 Michal Režný as Marcel
 Kamil Nożyński as Juzek
Aleksander Mincer as Kaczmarek 
Ksawery Szlenkier as Adamek

See also
 Pilecki's Report is a report about the Auschwitz concentration camp written in 1943 by Witold Pilecki
 Vrba–Wetzler report
 List of submissions to the 93rd Academy Awards for Best International Feature Film
 List of Slovak submissions for the Academy Award for Best International Feature Film

References

External links
 

2021 films
2021 drama films
Slovak drama films
Slovak-language films
German drama films
Czech drama films
Czech World War II films
German World War II films
Slovak World War II films